Zulfiqar "Xulfi" Jabbar Khan (born 28 October 1980) is a Pakistani composer, singer-songwriter, music producer and a guitarist. Starting his career in 1994, Khan is the recipient of multiple awards in Pakistan. He is currently working on the television series Coke Studio, for which he is the producer and mentor.

Life and career
Xulfi graduated from the National University of Computer and Emerging Sciences with a CGPA of 2.4. He was the composer, music producer, guitarist for Entity Paradigm (EP). Entity Paradigm was formed by Xulfi between 1996 and 1999 but was officially announced as a band only in 2000.

He is currently the music producer, songwriter, and lead guitarist for the band Call. After the vocalist's exit from the band, he continued with other projects at his studio Xth Harmonic. The band made a comeback after 3 years to produce and perform new songs for the fans. He has always been a music fanatic and tries to come up with new ideas. He blames the lack of proper recognition of music as a separate 'industry', as the reason for its limited success. Additionally, he states that people in general are not exposed to arts and culture and cultural propagation must be encouraged to make a pervasive and progressive culture and spark the positive interest of the nation in the field.

Khan has also been involved in a number of Bollywood projects as composer, lyricist and producer. Some of his works include "Laaree Chooti" from Ek Chalis Ki Last Local in 2007, "Yeh Pal" from Aasma in 2009, "Dhadke Jiya" from Aalo Chaat in 2009, and "Kuch Aisa, Kuch Aisa (Sad Version)" and "Reh Jaane Do" from Aao Wish Karein in 2009.

Khan has produced, recorded, engineered, mixed and mastered music albums for Call's Jilawatan and Dhoom, Entity Paradigm's album Irtiqa, Jal's album Aadat, Roxen's album Rozen-e-Deewar, Inteha's album Daastaan, and Ankur Tewari's album Jannat.

His work with Nescafé Basement has also been praised. In 2015, Roxette shared Nescafé Basement's cover of their song "She's Got the Look". In 2016, John Newman expressed his appreciation for the Nescafé Basement cover version of his song "Love Me Again" by an all-female band (with Xulfi as the producer), and called it "dope".

Xulfi is the creative director and co-founder of Sync, a tech/driven experience curation company. Recently they have worked on the visual curation of Nescafé Basement'''s "Resistance", Coca-Cola "Hum Aik Hain" anthem and Fawad Khan's "Uth Jaag" for Pepsi Battle of the Bands. Xulfi has also co-founded Giraffe Pakistan, a content creation company and creative hub with Muhammad Ibrahim and Sync is the subdivision of it. He acts as the chief creative officer (CCO).

 Brands and endorsements 
Xulfi has worked with various popular brands including Nescafé Basement, Pepsi Battle of the Bands, McDonald's, Coke, Peshawar Zalmi and more. He produced "Hum Aik Hain" the official anthem by Coca-Cola Pakistan for 2019 Cricket World Cup. This anthem featured 40 musical instruments, most of which were indigenous instruments.

Khan also produced the team anthem for Pakistan Super League team Peshawar Zalmi named as "Hum Zalmi"..Xulfi also assembled 40 drummers to create a new national song "Pakistan Zindabad", which was also featured in Gulf News. This song was created to revive the spirit of nationalism. 40 drummers gathered at Bradlaugh Hall for this song.

Zulfiqar joined hands with WWF Pakistan to create awareness about planting trees and released a video song "Rung Do". Khan termed it as more than just a song in an interview with Dawn News.

For Pepsi Battle of the Bands season 2, Khan came for a reunion with Entity Paradigm and performed "Hamesha" with Fawad Khan, Ahmad Ali Butt, and the entire original lineup.

In August 2020, Khan became the first Pakistani musician to get endorsed by Vicoustic – a soundproofing company specializing in acoustic treatments.

 Contributions to Pakistani music 
Xulfi has contributed to Pakistani music not only through music but by introducing new bands and musicians. On Nescafé Basement, he helped formed the first-ever all-girl band in Pakistan. Another band that Xulfi formed in Nescafé Basement'' is the all-kids band that covered "Pyar Diyan Gallan" by Fakhar-e-Alam.

Pakistan Super League 5 
Xulfi composed and produced the official PSL Anthem named "Tayyar Hain" for the 5th edition of Pakistan Super League. The anthem featured Haroon, Asim Azhar, Ali Azmat, and Arif Lohar. The song received heavy criticism from listeners, particularly on social media. This edition is the fastest to reach 5 million views on YouTube amongst previous PSL anthems. The song got appreciation from all the stakeholders including team owners, players, and the Pakistan Cricket Board because of its festive theme, cultural music, and upbeat composition.

Music videos

Discography

Albums

Fire records Pakistan

Nescafé Basement 
He was music producer and mentor for Nescafé basement season 1–5.

Coke Studio Season 14 
In June 2021, Zulfiqar Jabbar Khan was announced as the producer of Coke Studio Season 14, taking over the popular music show from Rohail Hyatt. The official announcement was made by Xulfi on his social media channels when he shared a picture of a Coke Studio Season 14 book with the caption "The journey begins". The news went viral on the internet and fans expressed great excitement, terming it as the best thing to happen to Coke Studio

References

External links

Living people
1980 births
Pakistani male singer-songwriters
21st-century Pakistani male singers
Urdu music
Musicians from Lahore
Pakistani heavy metal guitarists
20th-century Pakistani male singers
Pakistani composers
Pakistani record producers
National University of Computer and Emerging Sciences alumni